Iain Cuthbertson (4 January 1930 – 4 September 2009) was a Scottish character actor and theatre director. He was known for his tall imposing build and also his distinctive gravelly, heavily accented voice. He had lead roles in The Borderers (1968–70),Tom Brown's Schooldays (1971), Budgie (1971–72), its spinoff Charles Endell Esquire (1979–80), Danger UXB (1979) and Sutherland's Law (1973–76), as well as the films The Railway Children (1970), and Gorillas in the Mist (1988). He guest starred in many prominent British shows including The Avengers, Dr. Finlay's Casebook, The Onedin Line, Survivors, Ripping Yarns, Doctor Who, Z-Cars, Juliet Bravo, Rab C. Nesbitt, Minder, Inspector Morse and Agatha Christie's Poirot.

Early life
Born in 1930, the son of the biochemist Sir David Cuthbertson, and brought up in Glasgow, he was educated at Glasgow Academy. He moved to Aberdeen with his family and attended Aberdeen Grammar School and the University of Aberdeen, where he graduated with an MA honours degree in French and Spanish. His first break as an actor was on radio while at university.

He spent two years' national service in the Black Watch. During that time he was ordered to act as prisoner's friend at the court martial of a soldier accused of appearing late on parade, and then assaulting his superior officer when he eventually did turn up. He managed to get the soldier cleared of the more serious charge.

His original wish was for a job in the Foreign Office, but he became a radio journalist with the BBC in Glasgow.

Theatre career
Cuthbertson started acting at the Glasgow Citizens' Theatre in 1958 and became General Manager and Director of Productions in 1962. In that year the theatre hosted an exhibition of work by the artist Stewart Bowman Johnson Three years later he became Associate Director of London's Royal Court Theatre.

Television career
His most memorable television role was as the eponymous Procurator Fiscal in the long running Sutherland's Law, a television series made by BBC Scotland between 1973 and 1976. The series had originated as a stand-alone edition of the portmanteau programme Drama Playhouse in 1972 in which Derek Francis played Sutherland and was then commissioned as an ongoing series: the producer was Frank Cox. Sutherland's Law dealt with the duties of the Procurator Fiscal in a small Scottish town. The major cast members included Cuthbertson (as John Sutherland), Gareth Thomas, Moultrie Kelsall, Victor Carin, Martin Cochrane, Maev Alexander and Edith MacArthur.

A rather different achievement was his portrayal of the criminal and businessman Charlie Endell in both Budgie (London Weekend Television/ITV) with Adam Faith (1971–72) and its sequel Charles Endell Esquire (Scottish Television/ITV) in 1979.

Other roles include the lead in The Borderers (BBC, 1968–70), Tom Brown's Schooldays (BBC, 1971) (as Thomas Arnold), The Stone Tape (BBC, 1972), Children of the Stones (HTV/ITV, 1977), The Voyage of Charles Darwin, Danger UXB (Thames Television/ITV, 1979), The House With Green Shutters (BBC, 1980).  He appeared in the pilot episode of Rab C Nesbitt (1988) as a magistrate.

He suffered a crippling stroke in January 1982, which forced him to give up theatre for fear of forgetting his lines. He resumed television and film work, though, as his lines could be written on crib boards. His first role following his stroke was as the villainous Scunner Campbell in Super Gran (Tyne Tees Television/ITV, 1985). In 1989 he played the villain Brett Savernake in the episode of Campion entitled "Sweet Danger".

Minor parts in ongoing series include appearances in Z-Cars (BBC), The Avengers (ABC/ITV), Inspector Morse (Central Television/ITV), Bulman (Granada Television/ITV), Ripping Yarns (BBC), The Duchess of Duke Street, Colonel Mannering in Adam Adamant Lives! story D For Destruction (1966) and Garron in the Doctor Who story The Ribos Operation. He also appeared in: Diamond Crack Diamond, The Onedin Line (BBC), Survivors (BBC), Scotch on the Rocks, The Adventures of Black Beauty (London Weekend/ITV), Minder (ITV), The Ghosts of Motley Hall (Granada/ITV), Juliet Bravo (BBC), Casualty (BBC), The Mourning Brooch, Casting the Runes and McPhee the Mother and Me.

On film, he appeared as Charles Waterbury in The Railway Children (1970).

Personal life
Cuthbertson's first marriage, to Anne Kristen in 1964, was dissolved in 1988. He is survived by his second wife, Janet Smith.

From 1975 to 1978, he served as Rector of the University of Aberdeen. He listed his hobbies as sailing and fishing, and, after retiring, he lived in Dalrymple, Ayrshire.

He suffered a severe stroke in 1982, which caused paralysis down one side of his body and speech loss. It took him almost two years to recover sufficiently to be able to act again. Although he avoided live theatre work thereafter, owing to a fear of forgetting and/or stumbling on lines, he was still able to take parts in films and television. He died in 2009 at Ayr Hospital and was cremated.

Filmography

Film

Television

Radio
 1981 Hatter's Castle as James Brodie; by A J Cronin; BBC R4 Classic Serial 5 parts 11/1/1981-8/11/1981.
 1988 Our Roman Cousins by Bruce Stewart; BBC R4 Saturday Night Theatre 30/01/1988.
 1993 Twelfth Night as Malvolio; BBC R3 3/1/1993.

References

External links

1930 births
2009 deaths
20th-century Scottish male actors
21st-century Scottish male actors
Alumni of the University of Aberdeen
Black Watch soldiers
Male actors from Glasgow
People educated at Aberdeen Grammar School
People educated at the Glasgow Academy
Rectors of the University of Aberdeen
Scottish male film actors
Scottish male stage actors
Scottish male television actors
Scottish theatre directors
British theatre directors